Farciminaria is a genus of bryozoans belonging to the family Farciminariidae.

The species of this genus are found in Australia, Japan, Atlantic Ocean.

Species:

Farciminaria aculeata 
Farciminaria biseriata 
Farciminaria cribraria 
Farciminaria punctata 
Farciminaria simplex 
Farciminaria uncinata

References

Bryozoan genera